Bertrand of Comminges (c. 1050 - 1126) was Bishop of Comminges, in the diocese of Toulouse, France. It is after him that the commune of Saint-Bertrand-de-Comminges, is named.

Early life
Bertrand de l'Isle was born at L'Isle-Jourdain, in 1050, to Raymond Atton, who was a military officer and Lord of L'Isle-Jourdain, and Gervaise Emma Taillefer, daughter of Count William III Taillefer de Toulouse. William IV and Raymond IV of Saint-Gilles, were his cousins. Bertrand was raised to be a knight but in adulthood he entered religious life.

Religious life
Bertrand became a canon of Saint Augustine in Toulouse, and then successively archdeacon of Toulouse (circa 1070) and Lugdunum Convenarum (taking office between 1078 and 1080). In this role, which he maintained until his death, he implemented in his mountain diocese  principles of the Gregorian reform, both in regard to the discipline of clergy as religious and moral life of the laity. He participated in the reform councils of Bordeaux (1093), Clermont (1095) and Poitiers (1100).

During his long episcopate, almost half a century,
the city of Lugdunum Convenarum - which would later take his name, Saint-Bertrand-de-Comminges - was revived. It became a stop for pilgrims on the way to Santiago de Compostela. He rebuilt the cathedral, with its Romanesque cloister. The cathedral would later be dedicated in his honour. It is listed as a UNESCO World Heritage Sites of the Routes of Santiago de Compostela in France.

Death and legacy

Upon his death he was considered a saint in that locale.  Around 1167, the Archbishop of Auch commissioned a cleric named Vital to write his life and sent to the Curia for his canonization. The first the cause for beatification was rejected, but later Pope Honorius III opened an investigation in 1218. Later the pontiff beatified him between 1220 and 1222, although this is not evidenced by any document of the time. In 1309, in any case, Pope Clement V, who was himself Bishop of Comminges, lifted Bertrand to the sainthood. A magnificent tomb was built in their honor by Cardinal Pierre de Foix, who occupied the episcopal seat of Comminges from 1422 to 1442.

Notes

French Roman Catholic saints
12th-century Christian saints
12th-century French Roman Catholic bishops
1126 deaths
1050s births